Amityville is a village near the Town of Babylon in Suffolk County, on the South Shore of Long Island, in New York. The population was 9,523 at the 2010 census.

History
Huntington settlers first visited the Amityville area in 1653 due to its location to a source of salt hay for use as animal fodder. Chief Wyandanch granted the first deed to land in Amityville in 1658. The area was originally called Huntington West Neck South (it is on the Great South Bay and Suffolk County, New York border in the southwest corner of what once called Huntington South), but is now the Town of Babylon. According to village lore, the name was changed in 1846 when residents were working to establish its new post office. The meeting turned into bedlam and one participant was to exclaim, "What this meeting needs is some amity". Another version says the name was first suggested by mill owner Samuel Ireland to name the town for his boat, the Amity.

The place name is strictly speaking an incidental name, marking an amicable agreement on the choice of a place name. The village was formally incorporated on March 3, 1894. In the early 1900s, Amityville was a popular tourist destination with large hotels on the bay and large homes. Annie Oakley was said to be a frequent guest of vaudevillian Fred Stone. Will Rogers had a home across Clocks Boulevard from Stone. Gangster Al Capone also had a house in the community. Congregants began holding meeting for St. Mary's Church in 1886, building a Chapel in 1888 by Wesley Ketcham under Rev. James H Noble and the church was consecrated in 1889, pre-dating the town incorporation.

Amityville has been a sister city with Le Bourget, France since 1979.

The Amityville Horror

Amityville is the setting of the book The Amityville Horror by Jay Anson, which was published in 1977 and has been adapted into a series of films starting in 1979. The story of The Amityville Horror can be traced back to a real life murder case in Amityville in November 1974, when Ronald DeFeo Jr. shot all six members of his family at 112 Ocean Avenue. In December 1975 George and Kathy Lutz and Kathy's three children moved into the house, but left after twenty-eight days, claiming to have been terrorized by paranormal phenomena produced by the house. Jay Anson's novel is said to be based on these events but has been the subject of much controversy; the murder case actually happened, but there has been no evidence that the house is or was haunted.

The local residents and authorities in Amityville are unhappy with the attention that The Amityville Horror brings to the town, and tend to decline requests to discuss it publicly. The website of the Amityville Historical Society makes no mention of the murders in 1974 or the period that the Lutz family lived at the house. When the History Channel made its documentary about The Amityville Horror in 2000, no member of the Historical Society would discuss the matter on camera.

The house featured in the novel still exists but has been renovated and the address changed in order to discourage tourists from visiting it. The Dutch Colonial Revival architecture house built in 1927 was put on the market in May 2010 for $1.15 million and sold in September for $950,000 (equivalent to $ million in ).

Geography

The Village of Amityville is bordered to the west by East Massapequa (in Nassau County), to the north by North Amityville, to the east and the south by Copiague, and to the south by the Great South Bay.

Demographics

As of the census of 2010, there were 9,523 people and 3,107 households in the village, with 2.61 persons per household. The population density was 4,506.9 people per square mile.

There were 3,997 housing units, of which 28.2% were in multi-unit structures. The homeownership rate was 71.8%. The median value of owner-occupied housing units was $443,500. 3.6% of housing units were vacant and 20.7% of occupied housing units were occupied by renters.

The racial makeup of the village was 81.7% White, 9.7% African American, 0.3% Native American, 1.8% Asian, 0.0% Pacific Islander, 4.1% from other races, and 2.5% from two or more races. Hispanic or Latino of any race were 13.1% of the population. The village was 74.5% non-Hispanic White.

There were 3,107 households, out of which 23.8% had children under the age of 18 living with them, 32.6% had individuals over the age of 65, 47.3% were married couples living together, 10.2% had a female householder with no husband present, and 38.1% were non-families. 30.4% of all households were made up of individuals, and 13.1% had someone living alone who was 65 years of age or older. The average household size was 2.43 and the average family size was 3.02.

In the village, the population was relatively old with 4.5% under the age of 5, 17.7% under the age of 18, 5.3% from 20 to 24, 23.0% from 25 to 44, 32.2% from 45 to 64, and 19.9% who were 65 years of age or older. The median age was 46.4 years.

78.7% of the population had lived in the same house 1 year & over. 14.9% of the entire population were foreign-born and 21.6% of residents at least 5 years old spoke a language other than English at home.

90.1% of residents at least 25 years old had graduated from high school, and 30.7% of residents at least 25 years old had a bachelor's degree or higher. The mean travel time to work for workers aged 16 and over was 27.8 minutes.

The median income for a household in the village was $74,366. The per capita income for the village was $35,411. 6.5% of the population were below the poverty line.

Education
All of the village is served by the Amityville Union Free School District, which also serves large portions of North Amityville and East Massapequa and a small portion of Copiague (however this part of Copiague is served by the Amityville Post Office and is probably thought to be part of Amityville).

As of the 2010–2011 School Year, the Amityville Union Free School District had 2,780 students. The racial demographics were 0% American Indian or Alaska Native, 54% non-Hispanic black or African-American, 35% Hispanic or Latino, 1% Asian or Native Hawaiian/Other Pacific Islander, 8% non-Hispanic white, and 2% multiracial. 51% of students were eligible for free lunch, 10% for reduced-price lunch and 11% of students were Limited English Proficient. 16.5% of students were classified as "Special Ed".

The school district had a graduation rate of 79% and 2% of students did not complete school. 87% of graduates received a Regents Diploma and 31% received a Regents Diploma with Advanced Designation. Of the 2011 completers, 35% planned to move on to 4-year College, 52% to 2-year College, 4% to Other Post-Secondary, 3% to the Military, 5% to Employment, 1% to Adult Services, 0% had other known post-secondary plans, and 1% had no known post-secondary plan.

The district has:
 One Elementary School (Pre-K and Kindergarten): Northeast Elementary School
 One Elementary School (Grades 1–3): Northwest Elementary School
 One Elementary School (Grades 4–6): Park Avenue Memorial Elementary School
 One Junior High School (Grades 7–9): Edmund W. Miles Middle School
 One High School (Grades 10–12): Amityville Memorial High School

For the 2011–2012 School Year, the Accountability Status for Northeast and Northwest Elementary Schools and the high school was "In Good Standing", while Park Avenue Memorial Elementary School was "In Need of Correction Action (year 2) Focused" and the middle school was "In Need of Restructuring (year 1) Comprehensive". The Accountability Status for the district overall was "In Good Standing"

Up until recently, Amityville Memorial High School served grades 9–12, Edmund W. Miles Middle School served grades 6–8, Park Avenue Memorial Elementary School served grades 3–5, and Northwest Elementary School served grades 1–2. The first part of the change was implemented at the start of the 2009–2010 School Year when new 9th graders were kept at Edmund W. Miles Middle School and new 6th graders were kept at Park Avenue Memorial Elementary School. At the start of the 2012–2013 school year, new 3rd graders were kept at Northwest Elementary School.

Points of interest 

 The Triangle – The fork of Broadway and Park Avenue, along with Ireland Place create a triangular plot of land at the center of the village. The Triangle building was built in 1892, the same year that Ireland Place opened. A gazebo was added to the north point of The Triangle prior to 1987. In 1994, The Triangle was officially designated "Memorial Triangle" in memory of all who have served the village.
 The Lauder Museum is located at the corner of Broadway and Ireland Place, just south of The Triangle. The historic building was built for the Bank of Amityville in 1909. The Amityville Historical Society opened the Lauder Museum in 1972.
 The Mike James Courts at Bolden Mack Park – not located in the village of Amityville, the Courts are located in the Hamlet of North Amityville which is an unincorporated section of the Town of Babylon. The hamlet is north of, and immediately adjacent to, the village of Amityville.
 The Amityville beach
 Sand Island – an island in the Great South Bay directly south of the Amityville beach and only accessible by boat.

Transportation
Amityville is served by the Babylon Branch of the Long Island Rail Road. The station is a hub for buses in the area:
 S1: Amityville - Halesite via New York State Route 110
 1A: Amityville - North Amityville
 S20: Sunrise Mall - Babylon
 S33: Sunrise Mall - Hauppauge

Notable people
 Henry Austin – 19th-century baseball player, died in Amityville.
 Alec Baldwin – actor
 Christine Belford – actress
 Rob Carpenter (born 1968) – American football wide receiver
 Prince Paul – Producer
 De La Soul – Hip hop trio.
 Benjamin Britten – World-renowned British classical composer; lived in Amityville from 1939 to 1942. Resided at the home of William Meyers and his wife.
Rik Fox – Bass guitarist.
 Tony Graffanino – MLB player
 Mike James – NBA player
 Kevin Kregel – astronaut
 Ronald DeFeo Jr. – mass murderer
 Tre Mason – NFL running back for Los Angeles Rams
 Donnie McClurkin – gospel singer
 Bill McDermott – CEO of ServiceNow and former CEO of SAP.
 John Niland – NFL player
 Peter Pears – Tenor and Benjamin Britten's romantic partner. Resided at the home of William Meyers and his wife.
 Robert Phillips – classical guitarist
 A. J. Price – NBA player
 George Ross – baseball player
 David Torn – composer, guitarist, and music producer
 Dave Weldon – U.S. Congressman
 Darrel Young – NFL player

References

External links

 
 Flag of Amityville, New York (Flags of the World)

Babylon (town), New York
Villages in New York (state)
Villages in Suffolk County, New York
Populated coastal places in New York (state)
The Amityville Horror